The Church of the Covenant (Euclid Avenue Presbyterian Church) is a historic church on Euclid Avenue in Cleveland, Ohio's University Circle. It is a Presbyterian congregation and a part of the Presbytery of the Western Reserve. 

It was built in 1911 to designs created by architects Cram and Ferguson. In 1968, the McGaffin Carillon was created by the Royal Eijsbouts bell foundry and added to the church's tower. In 1972, the church added an addition, designed by Richard Fleishman in a contemporary-brutalist style, to serve as a community education center. Church of the Covenant was added to the National Register of Historic Places in 1980.

References

External links
Church of the Covenant (home page)

Churches in Cleveland
Churches on the National Register of Historic Places in Ohio
Gothic Revival church buildings in Ohio
Churches completed in 1911
20th-century Presbyterian church buildings in the United States
Presbyterian churches in Ohio
University Circle
National Register of Historic Places in Cleveland, Ohio